Mpindi is one of the 56 clans of the Buganda Kingdom, one of the largest nations of Uganda. The Mpindi chief is Mazige, whose headquarters are located in Muyenje in Busiro County in Uganda.  The Mpindi clan has the mpindi, a Luganda word for cowpea (Vigna unguiculalta), as its totem.

Origin
According to legend, Mbogga, the founder of the clan, came with Ssekabaka (King) Kintu to establish the kingdom of Buganda along the north western shores of Lake Nalubaale (Victoria) during the 15th century. Traditionally, Mbogga's job in the palace was to look after the king's cow, "Mbulidde", a role that is now performed by the clan in the kingdom. The Mpindi Clan currently is divided into two units; one belongs to Mbogga with its headquarters on Nsumba Hill in Mawokota (current Mpigi District) and the other belongs to Mugalu in Kyaggwe (current Mukono District).

Mpindi Clan drum-Beat (Omubala Gw'ekika kye Mpindi)
The Mpindi clan has two drumbeats "mibala"
1. From the Mbogga line (Ssiga):
a) "Tungulako emu (referring to Enkejje - Haplochromis spp)"
b) "Kababembe cca, kababembe, nkejje zattu, cca"

2. From the Mazige, Kamyuka Mugalu, and Kamyuka kawenyera line:
a) "Samba egotto" nange nsambe erya Kamyuka

Popular Names for Men 
Bwabye, Kabanda, Kadoma, Kamyuuka, Kasenge, Katantazi, Kawenyera, Kikambi, Kitenda, Kyaluula, Kyembe, Kyeswa, Lukowe, Lutimba, Lyazi, Majeegwa, Matutu, Mbere, Mbogga, Mbogo, Mboowa, Mugalu, Mugenyi, Mukuuma, Muluuta, Muwoone, Muwube, Muyimbwa, Muyobyo, Nalikka, Nnankyama, Nsumba, Ntabaazi, Ntulume, Sebadduka, Ssalambwa, Ssekaluvu, Ssendegeya, Ssensawo, Sserubende, Ssewambwa, Wakibugu.

Popular Names for Women 
Bulyaba, Najjuko, Nakabanda, Nakafu, Nalube, Nalule, Namboowa, Namuganyi, Namugenyi, Namuswe, Namuyimbwa, Nannozi, Nansumba, Nawambwa.

References

Mpindi  clan 
 Official Buganda Kingdom Website
 Buganda.com
 101africa.com

Buganda